Nyctemera pseudokala is a moth of the family Erebidae first described by Rob de Vos in 1996. It is found on Buru in Indonesia.

References

Nyctemerina
Moths described in 1996